Carlow County Museum is a museum documenting the history of County Carlow. Located on College Street in Carlow town, the building was originally the Presentation Convent; it also houses the County Library and Archives.

History
The museum was founded by the Carlow Historical & Archaeological Society (CHAS), then the Old Carlow Society, in 1973, and was run by the Society on a voluntary basis until 2002. The collections were housed first in the old Christian Brothers' building, and latterly the former theatre room of the Town Hall from 1979. The museum was opened afresh in the redeveloped convent building in 2012, the last of the buildings to open in a new cultural quarter. It is now operated by Carlow Town Council and Carlow County Council in association with the CHAS.

Contents
The museum consists of four exhibition rooms, housing permanent and temporary displays. It holds a diverse collection which includes objects that cover the archaeological, history, social history and folk life of the local area. It is designated to collect archaeological finds by the National Museum of Ireland. One of the most notable objects on display is the 19th century pulpit from Carlow Cathedral which was included in The Irish Times A History of Ireland in 100 Objects. Other notable objects in the Museum's collections pertain to John Tyndall, Kevin Barry, Captain Myles Kehoe, and the Carlow Sugar Factory.

The museum unveiled a new installation as part of the Ireland 2016 Centenary Programme, the "Carlow 1916 Commemorative Stained Glass Panel" by Peadar Lamb, depicts a Carlow narrative on the 1916 Rising, featuring some of the key Carlow figures and the role they played in 1916.

There was a special exhibition about St. Willibrord titled: Saint Willibrord, Patron Saint of Luxembourg and his County Carlow Connection.

The museum's latest exhibit is the grave effigy of Robert Hartpole, Constable of Carlow Castle and High Sheriff of Carlow, dating from 1594.

See also
List of country houses in County Carlow
Oak Park, County Carlow

References

External links
Carlow County Museum
Carlow Historical and Archaeological Society - Museum History
Carlow Tourism
Carlow Military Museum
Discover Ireland

1973 establishments in Ireland
Museums established in 1973
Local museums in the Republic of Ireland
Museums in County Carlow
Buildings and structures in Carlow (town)
History of County Carlow